The men's hammer throw competition at the 2018 Asian Games took place on 26 August 2018 at the Gelora Bung Karno Stadium.

Schedule
All times are Western Indonesia Time (UTC+07:00)

Records

Results 
Legend
NM — No mark

References

External links
Results

Men's hammer throw
2018 Men